Basil Andrew Murray (1902–1937), was a British editor, journalist and Liberal Party politician.

Background
Murray was the second son of the scholar Gilbert Murray and Lady Mary Howard, daughter of the 9th Earl of Carlisle. He was educated at Charterhouse School and New College, Oxford (Classical Scholarship and Charles Oldham Prize). In 1927, he married Pauline Mary Newton, daughter of the artist of Algernon Newton. Their daughters were writers Ann Paludan (1928–2014) and Venetia Murray (1932–2004). His sister, the writer Rosalind Murray (1890–1967), was the first wife of Arnold J. Toynbee.

Professional career
Murray was Editor of Oxford Outlook from 1920–23. He was Equerry to H.I.H. Yasuhito, Prince Chichibu of Japan during his visit to Europe. As a journalist, he covered the Spanish Civil War from the Republican side, making radio broadcasts from Valencia. His biography of David Lloyd George, L. G. was published in 1932.

Political career
Murray was employed at the Liberal Campaign Department in 1927. He was Liberal candidate at the 1928 St Marylebone by-election. He was Liberal candidate for the Argyllshire division at the 1929 and 1935 General Elections.

Murray became involved in anti-Fascist activism after Hitler's rise to power and in 1936 managed to incite a riot by heckling the British fascist Oswald Mosley during a speech at Oxford. He was subsequently tried and convicted of breach of the peace in a proceeding described by the philosopher Isaiah Berlin as a disastrous miscarriage of justice.

Electoral record

Death and legacy
While the Valencia correspondent for the International News Service, he died on board the British hospital ship Maine on the way to Marseilles, purportedly of pneumonia. A scandalous account in which he caught the pneumonia from close contact with a female ape, is given by Sefton Delmer, who devotes six pages to it.

Murray provided Evelyn Waugh with the model and first name for his anti-hero, Basil Seal, star of the novels Black Mischief and Put Out More Flags. He was the model for Jasper Aspect in Wigs on the Green by Nancy Mitford.

References

1902 births
1937 deaths
Liberal Party (UK) parliamentary candidates
People educated at Charterhouse School
Alumni of New College, Oxford
British male journalists
British anti-fascists